Ananda Galappatti is a medical anthropologist and practitioner in the field of mental health in Sri Lanka. He received the Ramon Magsaysay Award for his efforts.

References

Year of birth missing (living people)
Galappatti, Ananda
Medical anthropologists
Mental health professionals
Ramon Magsaysay Award winners
Sri Lankan anthropologists